SHERP is a Ukrainian  UTV designed for rough and soggy terrain. The company is certified with international quality standards ISO 9001 and its headquartered in 	 Kyiv (Ukraine). Its vehicles are sold all over the world through a wide dealership network including ARGO and STREIT Group.

The key feature of SHERP vehicles is the large wheels with an onboard system to inflate or deflate them, which allows vehicles to travel through water, cross brushwood, scramble and climb up thin ice.

This design concept is copied by other manufacturers like BigBo and Shatun (articulated steering).

History of creation 
The Sherp all-terrain vehicle is based on a design developed by the late 2000s inventor Alexei Garagashyan from Saint Petersburga. One of his all-terrain vehicles was bought by Ukrainian entrepreneur Vladimir Shkolnik. Seeing the prospect of sales, Shkolnik created the production of all-terrain vehicles. In 2012, he set up a design office in Kyiv to refine the concept into an industrial product. Assuming the main sales in Russia, in 2014 he organized production in St. Petersburg.

In 2014, Sherp LLC was established, serial production of snowmobiles began in 2015. In the same year, the Sherp was presented at the crossovers and off-road vehicles Moscow Off-Road Show 2015 held in Moscow.

In the media 
In February 2016, SHERP appeared on the show Top Gear.

In July 2017, SHERP was demonstrated in the Canadian towns of Whitehorse and Yellowknife.

In October 2017, SHERP was shown on the Diesel Brothers TV show.

In January 2018, the Sudbury SHERP dealer featured on Discovery Canada show Daily Planet.

In July 2019, the SHERP is featured with 2 Chainz in GQ and Viceland's video series Most Expensivest Sh*t.

In August 2019, SHERP is featured with Kevin Hart on Jay Leno's Garage.

In November 2019, SHERP were featured in Kanye West’s music videos for Follow God and Closed on Sunday. West also appeared with the SHERP in a 2022 Super Bowl LVI commercial for McDonald's.

References

External links

 (English)

Cars introduced in 2012
Wheeled amphibious vehicles
Off-road vehicles